Chaetostoma dupouii is a species of catfish in the family Loricariidae. It is native to South America, where it occurs in the Tuy River basin in Venezuela. The species reaches  SL. It was described in 1945 by Agustín Fernández-Yépez, a Venezuelan ichthyologist, with its type locality listed as the Encantado River, a tributary of the Río Grande, which itself is a tributary of the Tuy River.

Chaetostoma dupouii occasionally appears in the aquarium trade, where it is sometimes referred to as Dupou's rubbernose.

References

dupouii
Fish described in 1945